This is a list of cities and conurbations in the United Kingdom sorted by their Gross Value Added (GVA), a measure of the value of goods and services produced in an area, industry or sector of an economy. The Office for National Statistics produces Gross Value Added (GVA) data in terms of Nomenclature of Territorial Units for Statistics (NUTS). The lowest spatial area for which they are made is NUTS 3. Most cities are NUTS 3 areas in their own right. Some NUTS 3 areas are made up of groups of authorities or metropolitan boroughs, such as the county of Greater Manchester and the conurbation of Tyneside, and tend to reflect high levels of economic coherence.

Lists 

The table below lists the largest NUTS 3 city regions by their Gross Value Added using data published by the Office for National Statistics published annually in December.

See also 

 List of ceremonial counties in England by gross value added

Notes

References 

GVA
NUTS 3 statistical regions of the United Kingdom
GVA
GVA